Rosalba alcidionoides is a species of beetle in the family Cerambycidae. It was described by Thomson in 1864. It is known from Colombia.

References

Rosalba (beetle)
Beetles described in 1864